Line 2 of the Harbin Metro is a rapid transit line in Harbin, running from Jiangbei University Town to Meteorological Observatory. The line is 28.7 km long with 19 stations, all of which are underground. It opened on September 19, 2021.

Stations

References

02
Railway lines opened in 2021